WABH (1380 AM) is a radio station broadcasting a country music format. Located in Bath, New York, United States, the station serves the Elmira-Corning area. The station is owned by Gordon Ichikawa, through licensee Tower Broadcasting, LLC.

On December 1, 2008, WABH changed its format from oldies to sports.

On January 31, 2016, WABH changed their format from sports to adult standards.

Some time before the start of 2019, the station flipped to Nash Icon (adult country), picking up a format previously abandoned by WCKR.

History
The station first signed on November 17, 1962, with the call letters WFSR as a 500 watt daytimer.

References

External links

ABH
Radio stations established in 1962
1962 establishments in New York (state)